The 1920 Wisconsin gubernatorial election was held on November 2, 1920.

Republican candidate John J. Blaine won the election with 52.98% of the vote, winning his first of three terms as Governor of Wisconsin due to the popularity of Emanuel L. Philipp and it would lead to his victorious campaigns for U.S. Senate. Blaine defeated Democratic Party candidate Robert McCoy, Socialist candidate William Coleman and Prohibition Party candidate Henry H. Tubbs.

Primary elections
Primary elections were held on September 7, 1920.

Democratic primary

Candidates
Robert Bruce McCoy, general in the National Guard, former Monroe County Court judge and Mayor of Sparta

Results

Republican primary

Candidates
John J. Blaine, incumbent Attorney General of Wisconsin
Edward Dithmar, incumbent Lieutenant Governor
Merlin Hull, incumbent Secretary of State of Wisconsin
Gilbert E. Seaman, regent of the University of Wisconsin
James N. Tittemore, unsuccessful candidate for Republican nomination for Governor in 1918
Roy P. Wilcox, incumbent State Senator, unsuccessful candidate for Republican nomination for Governor in 1918

Results

Socialist primary

Candidates
William Coleman, union organizer, unsuccessful candidate for the Wisconsin House of Representatives in 1908

Results

Prohibition primary

Candidates
Henry H. Tubbs, Prohibition nominee for Wisconsin's 1st congressional district in 1904

Results

General election

Candidates
Major party candidates
John J. Blaine, Republican
Robert Bruce McCoy, Democratic

Other candidates
Henry H. Tubbs, Prohibition
William Coleman, Socialist

Results

References

Bibliography
 
 
 

1920
Wisconsin
Gubernatorial
November 1920 events